As of 2019, there are no universities in Sint Eustatius.

See also 
 List of universities by country

References

Universities
Sint Eustatius
Sint Eustatius
Universities and colleges in the Dutch Caribbean